1-800-FREE-411 is an American service offering advertising-supported directory assistance, operated by Marchex.

Service
Callers dial 1-800 (888 or 866)-FREE411 [373-3411] from any phone in the United States to use the toll-free service. Sponsors cover part of the service cost by playing advertising messages during the call. Callers always hear an ad at the beginning of the call, and then another after they have made their request. Callers then identify the city and state for the desired information, and can then search either by name or by business type. Free directory assistance is also available from an application for the iPhone and Android mobile phones, and from their website. The service, provided entirely by computer and with no human operators, uses a voice-recognition database to recognize names or places spoken by the user.

Corporate overview
The original parent corporation, Jingle Networks, was formed in 2005, and received its initial funding from First Round Capital of $400,000. By the spring of 2008 it had, according to TechCrunch, "captured a six percent market share of directory assistance calls." At that time, Jingle Networks received 20 million calls per month. Since that peak, the company has reported fewer calls, around 15 million per month, as consumers shift to smart-phones to get directory information.

On October 23, 2006, Jingle Networks announced that it raised $30 million in fourth round financing from Goldman Sachs and Hearst Corporation. This came after a $26 million round in April 2006, and a $5 million round in December 2005. Also on that date, Jingle Network's CEO volunteered on TechCrunch that his company was losing on average 5 cents for every call they processed. On June 25, 2008, TechCrunch repeated Jingle's press releases that they had reached per-call profitability.

Jingle Networks aims at attracting customers away from an existing fee-based market. The Wall Street Journal described it as "inspired by the business model of Google".
From 2005 through the early 2010, Jingle Networks guessed they saved consumers $1 billion based on an inflated rate of $2 a call for directory assistance.

In April 2011, Marchex bought Jingle Networks for $62.5M in combination of cash and stock. Marchex says Jingle Networks will generate more than $26 million in 2011 revenue, up more than 40 percent over 2010. Marchex said it expects call-driven revenue to make up 75 percent of the company's 2011 revenue.

See also 
 4-1-1
 800-THE-INFO (discontinued)
  (discontinued)
 GOOG-411 (discontinued)
 List of speech recognition software
 Speech recognition
 Tellme Networks

References

External links
Official website

Telecommunications companies established in 2005
Companies based in Seattle
Telecommunications companies of the United States
800-Free-411
Directory assistance services
American companies established in 2005